Györgyi Korda is a Hungarian former ice dancer. With Pál Vásárhelyi, she is the 1964 Winter Universiade champion, the 1964 Blue Swords champion, and a seven-time Hungarian national champion. The duo competed at four World and six European Championships. They placed among the European top five in 1963 (Budapest, Hungary), 1964 (Grenoble, France), and 1965 (Moscow, Soviet Union).

Competitive highlights 
With Vásárhelyi

References 

20th-century births
Hungarian female ice dancers
Universiade medalists in figure skating
Living people
Year of birth missing (living people)
Universiade gold medalists for Hungary
Competitors at the 1964 Winter Universiade